The Sixth Amendment to the Constitution of Pakistan (Urdu: آئین پاکستان میں چھٹی ترمیم) was adopted by the elected Parliament of Pakistan on December 22, 1976, under the government of Prime minister Zulfikar Ali Bhutto.  The VI Amendment stated that Chief Justice of Supreme Court will be retired at the age of 65 and a High Court honorable judge shall be retired at the age of 62.

Text

References

External links
Government of Pakistan

06
Government of Zulfikar Ali Bhutto